The 1946–47 British Ice Hockey season featured the English National League and Scottish National League.

English National League

English National Tournament

Results

English Autumn Cup

Results

Scottish National League

Regular season

Playoffs
Semifinals
Dunfermline Vikings - Paisley Pirates 10:5 on aggregate (7:4, 3:1)
Fife Flyers - Perth Panthers 16:9 on aggregate (9:2, 7:7) 
Final
Dunfermline Vikings - Fife Flyers 7:2 on aggregate (2:0, 5:2)

Scottish League Flag Competition

Results

Simpson Trophy

Results
Known scores
Dunfermline Vikings - Perth Panthers 7:3 
Falkirk Lions - Fife Flyers 6:4
Ayr Raiders - Paisley Pirates 7:4 
Perth Panthers - Paisley Pirates 6:5 
Fife Flyers - Dundee Tigers 8:4 
Ayr Raiders - Falkirk Lions 7:4 
Ayr Raiders - Dundee Tigers 10:5 
Dundee Tigers - Falkirk Lions 9:4 
Fife Flyers - Falkirk Lions 8:3
Ayr Raiders - Fife Flyers 12:7 
Dunfermline Vikings - Perth Panthers 7:9
Table

Canada Cup

Results

References 

British
1946 in English sport
1947 in English sport
1946–47 in British ice hockey
1946 in Scottish sport
1947 in Scottish sport